Riverside Cemetery Gatehouse is a historic office building located in Riverside Cemetery at 3607 Pearl Road in Cleveland, Ohio. It was completed in 1897, and added to the National Register of Historic Places in 1987. A significant interior renovation occurred about 1991 to 1992.

Constructing the gatehouse
The Riverside Cemetery Association was formed on November 15, 1875. Riverside Cemetery opened on July 8, 1876, on a bluff overlooking the west bank of the Cuyahoga River in the unincorporated village of Brooklyn Centre (now a neighborhood which is part of Cleveland, but then an independent settlement). It was a garden-style cemetery, and at the time of its dedication the largest cemetery on Cleveland's west side.

As the cemetery was being laid out in 1875, the cemetery association constructed a wooden office building in the southwest corner of the property near the corner of Pearl Road and Willowdale Avenue. But as the cemetery grew, this structure proved too small for administrative needs. The cemetery's trustees approved construction of a new building at their annual meeting on December 9, 1895.

Noted local architect Charles W. Hopkinson was hired to develop the plans for the new building. The date on which Hopkinson was hired is not known, but he submitted plans to the cemetery trustees probably in April 1896. The trustees approved his plans on May 4. Hopkinson recommended that the building be constructed of granite. But granite was expensive, and the trustees asked the architect to re-estimate the cost using red brownstone (a building material popular at the time) instead. The difference was significant, and the trustees chose brownstone.

Construction contracts were let on June 30, 1896, and construction began on July 9, 1896.

The architectural style of the building has been variously described as "French château", Gothic Revival, and Romanesque Revival. One source called it a combination of Gothic Revival and Romanesque Revival. The structure consists of a steel beam frame with red-colored brownstone walls. The stone was quarried near Longmeadow, Massachusetts, and mortared with Portland cement. The base of the veranda which wraps around the building is poured-in-place cement. The building features a turret on the southwest corner that reaches beyond the roof, dormer windows on the second floor, and buttresses on all sides.

Construction was largely complete by the end of 1896, although interior work continued into early 1897.

The final cost of the building was variously reported as $18,000 ($ in  dollars), $19,000 ($ in  dollars), and $20,000 ($ in  dollars).

About the building

The Riverside Cemetery Gatehouse has two above-ground stories and a basement. As originally constructed, the first floor contained a reception room, office, fireproof vault, and a women's bathroom. The floors on the first floor reception room and women's bathroom were covered with mosaic tile. The reception room was the largest space on the first floor. The reception room also featured a gas-fired fireplace with a wide mantel, and an "art window" made of 2,955 pieces of clear and stained glass. The office measured . Its walls were tinted plaster, it had a ceiling panelled in oak, and it had oak flooring.

A narrow, winding staircase led to the second floor. Two meeting rooms existed on the second floor for the use of the trustees. With the exception of the first floor reception room and office, each of the rooms on the first and second floor were panelled with quarter-sawn oak. Chandeliers of Flemish brass lit the reception room, office, and both second floor rooms.

The basement consisted of closets and storage space, and contained a furnace room.

The roof was made of red Spanish-made terracotta tile, with copper flashing.

History of the building
The building was originally lit by natural gas, but this was converted to electricity in the early 20th century. At some point, the ladies' bathroom was divided, so that a men's bathroom could be added.

Shortly prior to 1992, the gatehouse underwent a significant renovation. The ceiling in the office was covered by a dropped ceiling of sound-dampening tiles, and the north and east entrances to the building were closed off.

See also
Riverside Cemetery Chapel

References

Notes

Citations

Bibliography

Gothic Revival church buildings in Ohio
Churches completed in 1876
Buildings and structures in Cleveland
National Register of Historic Places in Cleveland, Ohio